Dejan Stankovic (born 25 August 1985) is a Swiss beach soccer player of Serbian origin. He plays in forward position.

In 2011 Stankovic co-founded Grasshoppers Club Beach Soccer where he worked as coach for seven years before retiring in 2018.

Honours

National team
 Switzerland
Euro Beach Soccer League fourth place: 2005
Euro Beach Soccer Cup winner: 2005
Euro Beach Soccer League Italian Event  winner: 2008

Individual
Euro Beach Soccer League Best Player: 2007, 2011
Euro Beach Soccer League Top Scorer: 2007, 2010
Euro Beach Soccer Cup Top Scorer: 2007
Euro Beach Soccer League French Event Best Player: 2007
Euro Beach Soccer League Spanish Event Top Scorer: 2007
FIFA Beach Soccer World Cup Golden Ball: 2009
FIFA Beach Soccer World Cup Golden Shoe: 2009

References

External links
Biography

Swiss men's footballers
Living people
1985 births
Swiss people of Serbian descent
Swiss expatriate sportspeople in Spain
Swiss beach soccer players
Association football forwards
Beach soccer players at the 2015 European Games
Beach soccer players at the 2019 European Games
European Games bronze medalists for Switzerland
European Games medalists in beach soccer